The 2014 BRD Arad Challenger was a professional tennis tournament played on clay courts. It was the third edition of the tournament which was part of the 2014 ATP Challenger Tour. It took place in Arad, Romania between 2 and 8 June 2014.

Singles main-draw entrants

Seeds

 1 Rankings are as of May 26, 2014.

Other entrants
The following players received wildcards into the singles main draw:
  Vasile Antonescu
  Patrick Ciorcilă
  Petru-Alexandru Luncanu
  Constantin Sturdza

The following players received entry as alternates into the singles main draw:
  Aldin Šetkić

The following players used protected ranking to gain entry into the singles main draw:
  Daniel Kosakowski

The following players received entry from the qualifying draw:
  Bruno Sant'anna
  Franco Škugor
  Martín Cuevas
  Nikola Čačić

Doubles main-draw entrants

Seeds

1 Rankings as of May 26, 2014.

Other entrants
The following pairs received wildcards into the doubles main draw:
  Marius Copil /  Constantin Sturdza
  Victor Crivoi /  Patrick Grigoriu
  Petru-Alexandru Luncanu /  Adrian Ungur

Champions

Singles

 Damir Džumhur def.  Pere Riba, 6–4, 7–6(7–3)

Doubles

 Franko Škugor /  Antonio Veić def.  Radu Albot /  Artem Sitak, 6–4, 7–6(7–3)

External links
Official Website

BRD Arad Challenger
BRD Arad Challenger
2014 in Romanian tennis